1st Medium Regiment was an artillery regiment of the South African Army, after World War II.

History

Origin
1st Medium Regiment. South African Artillery, (SAHA), was established with headquarters in Cape Town on 1 January 1946.

Lt Colonel Norman Munnik, was appointed to command this regiment, having originally been with the 1st Heavy Battery, Coast Artillery Brigade. In the first few months of the regiment's existence, Lt Colonel Frank Whitmore Mellish, MC was also appointed as the regiment's Honorary Colonel.

Similar Unit
This regiment should not be confused with another regiment of identical title in the UDF history, an Active Citizen Force (ACF) unit formed in Johannesburg around 1939, specifically to continue the memory of the South African Heavy Artillery batteries that fought in France in 1915–1918.

Recruitment
Those citizens who had been balloted to ACF units around Cape Town, reported to the New Drill Hall at Tennant Street in Cape Town, for medical examination and attestation.

Training
After receiving their kit, recruits started about five months of training. Foot and rifle drill, parades took place every Tuesday and Thursday nights at the early morning market in Sir Lowry Road.
Mustering training took place at Youngsfield where the regiment had its hangar storing its soft vehicles, Jeeps, Ford 1 ton radio vehicles, 3 ton cargo, Mack gun tractors, 5.5 inch guns and all associated stores and equipment. Training took place on Saturdays and two full Saturdays per month for part of the year were normally allocated.

1 Medium Regiment with Cape Field Artillery utilised the military camp at Oudtshoorn for live fire training. Recruit camps were about three weeks at the end of which the continuous training period ended on the range conducting "dry runs" and live shell firing first with 25-pounders and on the last day, with 5.5 inch guns.

Converted to an Afrikaans speaking regiment
The regiment was declared an Afrikaans unit in the early 1950s and training gunnery terminology had to be translated at Oudtshoorn from English.

Transferred to Outeniqua Command
On 5 November 1953, it was announced that 1 Medium Regiment was being transferred to Outeniqua Command and in doing so Cape Town lost its most important Afrikaans speaking unit.

Disbandment
The regiment was finally disbanded and disestablished on 1 March 1960, when the Citizen Force was once again reorganised.

Leadership
Lt Colonel Norman Elijah Munnik 1946–1960

Regimental emblems

Dress Insignia

References

Artillery regiments of South Africa
Military units and formations established in 1946
South African Army
Military units and formations disestablished in 1960